The Superior Air Parts Vantage is a type certified piston aircraft engine developed by Superior Air Parts  of Coppell, Texas, United States and based upon the non-certified Superior Air Parts XP-360. The design is officially designated the Superior Air Parts O-360 and IO-360. Vantage is a marketing name.

The company is owned by the Chinese company Superior Aviation Beijing, which is 60% owned by Chairman Cheng Shenzong and 40% owned by Beijing E-Town, an economic development agency of the municipal government of Beijing.

Development
The Vantage engine is a development of the XP-360 experimental engine that was put through the US Federal Aviation Administration engine type certification process starting in 1996. Certification was based on FAR 33 through amendment 20, effective 13 December 2000, application 17 July 2001 and certification was achieved on 31 March 2004. The initial time between overhauls was set at 1,000 hours, with an aim of expanding that to 2,000 hours.

Design
The engine is a four-cylinder, horizontally opposed, four-stroke,  displacement, air-cooled, direct-drive, gasoline engine design. It produces , depending on the model. It is available in carburetor-equipped and fuel injected versions.

Variants

O-360

180 hp models
O-360-A1A2
O-360-A2A2
O-360-A3A2
O-360-A4A2
O-360-A5A2
O-360-A6A2
O-360-B1A2
O-360-B2A2
O-360-B3A2
O-360-B4A2
O-360-B5A2
O-360-B6A2
O-360-C1A2
O-360-C2A2
O-360-C3A2
O-360-C4A2
O-360-C5A2
O-360-C6A2
O-360-D1A2
O-360-D2A2
O-360-D3A2
O-360-D4A2
O-360-D5A2
O-360-D6A2
O-360-E1A2
O-360-E2A2
O-360-E3A2
O-360-E4A2
O-360-E5A2
O-360-E6A2

168 hp models
O-360-A1A1
O-360-A2A1
O-360-A3A1
O-360-A4A1
O-360-A5A1
O-360-B1A1
O-360-B2A1
O-360-B3A1
O-360-B4A1
O-360-B5A1
O-360-B6A1
O-360-C1A1
O-360-C2A1
O-360-C3A1
O-360-C4A1
O-360-C5A1
O-360-C6A1
O-360-D1A1
O-360-D2A1
O-360-D3A1
O-360-D4A1
O-360-D5A1
O-360-D6A1
O-360-E1A1
O-360-E2A1
O-360-E3A1
O-360-E4A1
O-360-E5A1
O-360-E6A1

IO-360

180 hp models
IO-360-A1A2
IO-360-A2A2
IO-360-A3A2
IO-360-A4A2
IO-360-A5A2
IO-360-A6A2
IO-360-B1A2
IO-360-B2A2
IO-360-B3A2
IO-360-B4A2
IO-360-B5A2
IO-360-B6A2
IO-360-C1A2
IO-360-C2A2
IO-360-C3A2
IO-360-C4A2
IO-360-C5A2
IO-360-C6A2
IO-360-D1A2
IO-360-D2A2
IO-360-D3A2
IO-360-D4A2
IO-360-D5A2
IO-360-D6A2
IO-360-E1A2
IO-360-E2A2
IO-360-E3A2
IO-360-E4A2
IO-360-E5A2
IO-360-E6A2

168 hp models
IO-360-A1A1
IO-360-A2A1
IO-360-A3A1
IO-360-A4A1
IO-360-A5A1
IO-360-A6A1
IO-360-B1A1
IO-360-B2A1
IO-360-B3A1
IO-360-B4A1
IO-360-B5A1
IO-360-B6A1
IO-360-C1A1
IO-360-C2A1
IO-360-C3A1
IO-360-C4A1
IO-360-C5A1
IO-360-C6A1
IO-360-D1A1
IO-360-D2A1
IO-360-D3A1
IO-360-D4A1
IO-360-D5A1
IO-360-D6A1
IO-360-E1A1
IO-360-E2A1
IO-360-E3A1
IO-360-E4A1
IO-360-E5A1
IO-360-E6A1

Applications
Cessna 172

Specifications (O-360-A1A2)

See also

References

External links

Boxer engines
2000s aircraft piston engines
Air-cooled aircraft piston engines
Superior Air Parts engines